In enzymology, an isopiperitenol dehydrogenase is an enzyme that catalyzes the chemical reaction

(-)-trans-isopiperitenol + NAD+  (-)-isopiperitenone + NADH + H+

Thus, the two substrates of this enzyme are (-)-trans-isopiperitenol and NAD+, whereas its 3 products are (-)-isopiperitenone, NADH, and H+.

This enzyme belongs to the family of oxidoreductases, specifically those acting on the CH-OH group of donor with NAD+ or NADP+ as acceptor. The systematic name of this enzyme class is (-)-trans-isopiperitenol:NAD+ oxidoreductase. This enzyme participates in monoterpenoid biosynthesis.

References

 

EC 1.1.1
NADH-dependent enzymes
Enzymes of unknown structure